Vanderson da Silva Souza (born August 24, 1986 in Londrina), or simply Vandinho,  is a Brazilian striker who plays for Rio Branco.

Career

Flamengo
After a great first half of 2008, scoring many goals for Avaí and being one of the top Brazilian goalscorers in all divisional levels, Flamengo signed Vandinho hoping he could solve the problem of lack of goals after the club's loss of many players due to transfers and injuries.

In his debut for the new club, he came from the bench in the beginning of the second half of a match against Cruzeiro in Maracanã Stadium on August 3, 2008 and after only 12 minutes he scored his first goal for Flamengo. Although, Flamengo eventually lost the match 1-2.

Flamengo career statistics
(Correct  February 13, 2009)

according to combined sources on the.

Sport Recife
On February 13, 2009 Vandinho signed his transfer from Flamengo to Sport Recife to play in the Copa Libertadores 2009.

Honours
 Paraná State League: 2006
 Campeonato Catarinense: 2010

References

External links
 
 
CBF 

1986 births
Living people
Brazilian footballers
Clube Atlético Juventus players
Paraná Clube players
Guaratinguetá Futebol players
São Paulo FC players
Avaí FC players
CR Flamengo footballers
Sportspeople from Londrina
Fluminense FC players
Associação Desportiva São Caetano players
Desportivo Brasil players
FC Spartak Vladikavkaz players
Brazilian expatriate footballers
Expatriate footballers in Russia
Expatriate footballers in Qatar
Al-Arabi SC (Qatar) players
Associação Portuguesa de Desportos players
Campeonato Brasileiro Série A players
Skövde AIK players
Qatar Stars League players
Association football forwards